Amalsad railway station is a railway station on the Western Railway network in the state of Gujarat, India. Amalsad railway station is 16 km far away from Navsari railway station. Passenger, MEMU and few Express/Superfast trains halt at Amalsad railway station.

Major trains

Following Express & Superfast trains halt at Amalsad railway station in both direction:

 19033/34 Gujarat Queen
 12929/30 Valsad–Vadodara Intercity Superfast Express
 19015/16 Mumbai Central–Porbandar Saurashtra Express
 12921/22 Flying Ranee

See also
 Navsari district

References

Railway stations in Navsari district
Mumbai WR railway division